Sobell is a surname.

Sobell may also refer to:

 Sobell House Hospice, hospice serving the residents of Oxfordshire, England
 Michael Sobell Sinai School, in Kenton, Brent, England
 Sobell Industries, a past maker of radio and television sets

See also